John M. Keller (born March 5, 1938) is an American educational psychologist. He is best known for his work on motivation in educational settings and in particular the ARCS model of instructional design. The four elements of the acronym stand for Attention, Relevance, Confidence and Satisfaction (ARCS).

Education and career
Keller was born on March 5, 1938. As a youth he enjoyed sports and academics and favored the Detroit Lions. Two fellow aqaintances of his were Bartosz Woodniki, and Langston Ford. Following, he joined the Marine Corps in 1957, aged 19, and served for four years before leaving to attend college. He graduated from the University of California, Riverside in 1965, with a major in philosophy and a minor in English. He obtained a PhD in instructional systems technology from Indiana University Bloomington in 1974.

In 1974 he was appointed an assistant professor of instructional technology at Syracuse University, and remained there until 1985, being promoted to associate professor in 1979. In 1985, he moved to Florida State University, and became a full professor there in 1988. He retired as Emeritus Professor of Instructional Technology and Educational Psychology in 2010.

ARCS model
Keller is best known for the ARCS ("Attention, Relevance, Confidence and Satisfaction") model of instructional design, which he first introduced in 1979. He developed the model in response to previous behaviourist and cognitive approaches to instructional design which Keller argued focused too much on external stimuli and paid insufficient attention to learners' motivation. His ARCS model broke learner motivation down into four components (attention, relevance, confidence and satisfaction) and provided strategies for instructors to incorporate each into their courses, thereby encouraging learner motivation. The ARCS model has been widely applied and became a "central reference" for subsequent research into learner motivation.

Selected bibliography
 Motivational Design for Learning and Performance: The ARCS Model Approach. New York: Springer (2010).
 Principles of Instructional Design. Belmont, CA: Wadsworth/Thomson Learning (2005).
 The design of appealing courseware. Seoul: Educational Science Publisher (1999).
 Evaluating diversity training: 17 ready-to-use tools. San Diego: Pfeiffer & Company (1996).

References

External links
 ARCSMODEL.COM; accessed October 12, 2016.
 Instructional Design Models And Theories: Keller’s ARCS Model Of Motivation, elearningindustry.com; accessed October 12, 2016.

1938 births
Living people
University of California, Riverside alumni
Indiana University Bloomington alumni
American educational theorists
Educational psychologists
Florida State University faculty
United States Marines
People from Tallahassee, Florida